Zapotitlán is a word of Nahuatl origin meaning "Place of the sapodilla". It may refer to:

Places
Guatemala
Zapotitlán, Jutiapa
San Francisco Zapotitlán, Suchitepéquez
San Martín Zapotitlán, Retalhuleu

Mexico
Zapotitlán Tablas, Guerrero
Zapotitlán de Vadillo, Jalisco
Zapotitlán del Río, Oaxaca
Zapotitlán Lagunas, Oaxaca
Zapotitlán Palmas, Oaxaca
Zapotitlán, Puebla
Zapotitlán de Méndez, Puebla

Other
 Zapotitlán metro station, station of the Mexico City Metro